Hellfest, also called Hellfest Summer Open Air, is a rock festival focusing on heavy metal music, held annually in June in Clisson, France. Its high attendance makes it the French music festival with the largest turnover. It is also one of the biggest metal festivals in Europe and the first to exist in France.

It originated in another music festival, the Fury Fest, held from 2002 to 2005, in different areas of Pays de la Loire. Hellfest took over in 2006 and over the years has seen a continuous rise in visitors, from 22,000 in the first edition, to 55,000 tickets sold per day in 2017. In 2022, the seven-day festival featured 350 bands and was attended by 60,000 people per day. 

Its programming is primarily focused on hard rock and metal on the two main stages, while each of the four other festival's stages are dedicated to a particular style like black metal, death metal, doom metal or stoner metal, making possible the presence of groups such as Iron Maiden, Deep Purple, Motörhead, Metallica, Guns N' Roses, ZZ Top and KISS, as well as that of Slayer, Megadeth, Sepultura, Cannibal Corpse or Anthrax.

Overview

The festival was the successor of Fury Fest, which was held in 2002 and 2003 in Clisson and Nantes respectively, and 2004 and 2005 in Le Mans. Drakkar Productions also hosted a yearly black metal festival titled "Drakkar Hellfest - Darkness and Hate" in 2000 and 2001 in southern France and held a third year in 2002 in the Netherlands.

In June 2009, numerous groups concerned about the concert name asked the festival sponsors to disengage from Hellfest. Coca-Cola announced a few days later that they will no longer support the festival.

In March 2010, two days before local elections, Prime Minister François Fillon and the leader of the MPF Philippe de Villiers came to support Christophe Béchu, candidate of the UMP for the regional elections of the Pays de la Loire. In front of 1,500 people Mr De Villiers reiterated his support for the candidate and attacked the metal music festival Hellfest: "Our values are not like those of the Regional Council (PS); to be funding a satanic festival!". The same month, former minister and leader of the Parti chrétien-démocrate Christine Boutin wrote to Kronenbourg asking them to stop supporting the festival. The 30 March, questioned by deputy Patrick Roy, the minister Frédéric Mitterrand declared to the Assemblée Nationale that the detractors of the festival should calm down. During the 2011 edition an homage was paid to Patrick Roy who died two months before.

On 9 June 2010, the AFC (Associations Familiales Catholiques) sued the Hellfest, asking them not to allow people under 18 years old to attend the festival and to give them the titles of the songs to be played during the 2010 edition. On 14 June, the judge refused their demand.

History

Early years 
The first association was created in 2000 in Clisson as "CLS CREW", in order to organize concerts of hardcore and punk in the region of Nantes. The success of these concerts made it possible to launch the first festival in June 2002, named Fury Fest. It gathered 400 people to attend Agnostic Front in Clisson at the sports complex of Val-de-Moine.

The festival continued the following years. It attracted 7,000 people to attend concerts of Sick of It All and Youth of Today (in) in 2003. The format changed to two days. Because no room was available in Clisson, the Hall of Trocardière (Rezé) hosted the second edition. The organization of the festival also changed: the "MAN.IN.FEST" association was created to take charge of the organization. In 2003, the festival had reached €30,000 in profit, allowing Benjamin Barbaud, one of the founders, to become an employee of the structure. In 2004, the festival moved to Le Mans and took place in the halls of the 24 Hours circuit where it attracted 21,000 spectators for bands such as Slipknot and Soulfly.

After a deficit in 2004, the 2005 festival inherited liabilities so that the organizing team decided to give the rights of the festival to other promoters in order to focus on organization. This time 30,000 admissions were recorded at Le Mans over three days, as fans came to see acts such as Slayer, Motörhead and Anthrax, across three stages. But financial problems worsened, particularly with the disappearance of the promoters with €600,000 in receipts. These losses marked the end of the festival, at least temporarily.

Cancellations for 2020 and 2021 editions 
On 8 April 2020, Benjamin Barbaud announced to Ouest-France that the 2020 edition of the festival would be cancelled due to the ongoing COVID-19 pandemic. The festival organization announced on 9 April 2020 that they paid on 17 December 2019 to Albingia, their insurance company, 175000 € for cancellation risks, including pandemic risks, but that the company refused to pay for the cancellation. The contract was sold before the development of the pandemic in China. It was reported that representatives from Albingia were claiming that the contract did not cover the pandemic because "respiratory diseases were excluded from the contract". On the day after its cancellation, it was announced that Hellfest was rescheduled to 18–20 June 2021.

On 19 February 2021, it was announced that Hellfest had once again been cancelled, due to "uncertainties about the health situation and the latest government regulations", and would be rescheduled to 2022.

References

External links

 Official website
 Pictures of Hellfest 2009

Music festivals in France
Heavy metal festivals in France